The Bastard Son & The Devil Himself is a British fantasy drama television series created by Joe Barton, based on the novel Half Bad by Sally Green. The series tells the story of Nathan Byrne, a young man discovering his true identity as the illegitimate son of the dangerous witch Marcus Edge. Netflix released the series October 28, 2022, but canceled future episodes despite positive reviews.

Premise 
Nathan Byrne has been quietly monitored by the Council of Fairborn Witches for the first 16 years of his life. The Council fears the illegitimate son of the "World's Most Dangerous Blood Witch" will turn out like his father. As the conflict between the Blood Witches and the Fairborn Witches escalates, Nathan finds himself the target of a modern-day witch hunt. He begins a life-or-death quest, building alliances with fellow witches Annalise and Gabriel, while learning about himself along the way.

Cast 

 Jay Lycurgo as Nathan Byrne
 Nadia Parkes as Annalise O'Brien
 Emilien Vekemans as Gabriel
 Isobel Jesper Jones as Jessica Byrne
 Karen Connell as Ceelia
 Paul Ready as Soul O'Brien
 David Gyasi as Marcus Edge
 Kerry Fox as Esmie
 Fehinti Balogun as Bjorn
 Misia Butler as Niall
 Liz White as Penelope
 Róisín Murphy as Mercury
 Tim Plester as Rowan
 Priya Kansara as Flo
 Orla McDonagh as Young Ceelia

Episodes

Development 

A feature-film adaptation based on the first book in the popular British fantasy series was under development at Fox 2000 on 5 April 2013. It was reported that Karen Rosenfelt, who had produced The Twilight Saga, Percy Jackson: Sea of Monsters, and The Book Thief,  would be in charge of production, but there were no further updates published by the studio .

On 13 December 2020, Netflix announced the production of a young adult television series based on the trilogy. The adaptation would be written and executive produced by Joe Barton, who would also act as showrunner. Joining Barton as executive producers would be Andy Serkis, Jonathan Cavendish and Will Tennant, with Serkis' own production company, Imaginarium Productions co-producing the series. The first season was reported to be eight one-hour episodes.

Netflix tweeted the series title, The Bastard Son & The Devil Himself, on 25 August 2022. On 21 September 2022, Colm McCarthy, Debs Paterson, and Rachna Suri were announced as directors of the series, with McCarthy also executive producing, Phil Robertson of Imaginarium as executive producer, and Adrian Sturges and Steve Clark-Hall as producers.

Casting 

Jay Lycurgo, Nadia Parkes, Emilien Vekemans, Isobel Jesper Jones and Karen Connell were announced as leads on 18 March 2022. Paul Ready, David Gyasi, Kerry Fox, Fehinti Balogun, Misia Butler, Liz White and Róisín Murphy also joined the main cast.

Filming 

Principal photography of the series began on 5 July 2021, with the majority of shooting taking place in London, UK. David Higgs was announced as the series' cinematographer, and Elen Lewis and Tom Chapman as editors.

Music 

Rosa Walton and Jenny Hollingworth of Let's Eat Grandma composed an original soundtrack for the first season. The duo shared in an interview that after reading the initial script they felt it would be compatible with their musical style. They cited various folklore and fairy tales as inspirations, in addition to the soundtracks from Under the Skin and Utopia.

Promotion
Netflix released a series trailer 13 October 2022, and the series premiered on 28 October 2022.

Reception 
The Bastard Son & The Devil Himself received positive reviews from critics and audiences alike.  

David Opie of Digital Spy rated the series 5/5 stars, praised the writing, visuals, and cast performances, especially from Jay Lycurgo and Emilien Vekemans. Jack Seale of The Guardian, gave the series 4/5 stars, praising its writing and visual effects, calling the latter "impressive" and "confusingly beautiful". Jack Taylor of The Telegraph, also rated the series 4/5 stars, similarly praised its writing, visuals and sounds, highlighting the "economic storytelling that made Giri/Haji such a captivating success," though criticizing the action scenes, calling them "dismally loud and boring". Sam Moore of Radio Times gave the series 3/5 stars, criticizing its tone, calling it "uneven" although praising the "snappy dialogue" and "stellar performances" of the casts. Joel Keller of Decider similarly criticized the tone, noting elements of "a typical teen-drama" while praising performances of the cast, particularly those of Nadia Parkes.

References

External links 
 
 

2022 British television series debuts
2022 British television series endings
2020s British drama television series
2020s British LGBT-related drama television series
British fantasy television series
Andy Serkis
English-language Netflix original programming
Television series about teenagers
Television series about witchcraft
Television series based on novels
Television shows based on British novels
Television shows set in London
Television shows shot in London
Bisexuality-related television series